Zaib is both a surname and a given name. Notable people with the name include:

Given name
 Zaib Rehman
 Zaib Shaikh
 Zaib Jaffar
 Zaib-un-Nissa
 Zaib un Nisa Awan
 Zaib-un-Nissa Hamidullah

Surname
 Alam Zaib (disambiguation)
 Salman Zaib
 Shah Zaib
 Salman Zaib
 Mian Gul Akbar Zaib